This is a list of films which have placed number one at the weekend box office in Japan during 2007.

Highest-grossing films

References

 Note: Click on the relevant weekend to view specifics.

2007
Japan
2007 in Japanese cinema